Lauge Koch (5 July 1892 – 5 June 1964) was a Danish geologist and Arctic explorer.

Biography 
Lauge Koch was born in 1892 to Karl and Elisabeth Koch. His development as a scientist was greatly influenced by his father's second cousin Johan Peter Koch - a polar explorer, a member of several Greenland expeditions, including Ludvig Mylius-Erichsen's and Alfred Wegener's (in the latter's expedition (1912-1913) to cross Greenland, he led a sledging party). He received his higher education at the University of Copenhagen, where he began his studies in 1911, in 1920 he received a master's degree, and in 1929 a doctor's degree, having defended a dissertation on the topic "Stratigraphy of Greenland".

General
He was the renowned leader of 24 Danish government expeditions to Greenland, and the central character in the Lauge Koch Controversy, an international and intra-national conflict.

Controversy started with a review of the Lauge Koch book Geologie von Grönland (1935) written by ‘the eleven’ and accusing Koch of poor and improper scientific practice. Relating to the years 1921–23 in which Lauge Koch conducted the Bicentenary Jubilee Expedition to North Greenland in the year of the bicentennial jubilee of Hans Egede's landing in Greenland, Koch made a sledge journey along the north coast of Greenland, round Peary Land and back across the Inland Ice. On this journey Koch discovered a depression which in his opinion was the one that Robert Peary in 1892 had mistaken for a channel —the so-called "Peary Channel". Koch's observations of the interior of Independence Fjord led to considerable cartographic changes compared with the Peter Freuchen map of 1912.

In 1922 he mapped Hiawatha Glacier, and noted that the glacier tongue extended into Lake Alida (near Foulk Fjord).

In 1938, Lauge Koch found in the mountains west of Jameson Land, near Scoresby Sound, the skeleton of a huge extinct mammal similar to the head of a gigantic animal with huge teeth found by Professor Selim Hassan in 1935 near the pyramid of Chephren. The skeleton found by Koch was displayed at the museum in Copenhagen.

Amongst his other contributions to the sciences, in the mid-1930s Koch established a network of field stations and traveling huts in Central East Greenland. This establishment of a permanent infrastructure in the field caused a change in the whole culture and organization of Danish Arctic exploration.

His last expedition would be the 1956-58 Expedition to East Greenland in which he used helicopters. But the Danish government cut funding in mid-expedition and Koch's career as expedition leader was terminated.

Legacy
The mineral kochite which is found in Mt Hvide Ryg, Werner Bjerge, and the former Greenland county of Tunu was named for Koch in honor of his explorations in the same areas.

Honours
Koch was awarded an Honorary Fellowship from the American Geographical Society in 1924, its Daly Medal in 1930, as well as the Vega medal of the Swedish Society for Anthropology and Geography. In 1927 he was awarded the Patron's Medal of the British Royal Geographical Society for his work in Greenland and the Hans Egede Medal of the Royal Danish Geographical Society. In 1949 he was awarded the Mary Clark Thompson Medal from the National Academy of Sciences.

See also
Cartographic expeditions to Greenland
Three-year Expedition (Treårsekspedition)
Peary Channel

References

Bibliography 
 
 
 
 
 

Danish geologists
Explorers of the Arctic
1964 deaths
1892 births
20th-century geologists